Auximobasis persimilella is a moth in the  family Blastobasidae. It was described by Walsingham in 1891. It is found in the West Indies.

References

Natural History Museum Lepidoptera generic names catalog

Blastobasidae
Moths described in 1891